Kiril Todorov Petkov (8 June 1933 – 22 January 2019) was a Bulgarian wrestler. He completed his military service at CSKA and graduated from the NSA. He competed in the 1960 Summer Olympics in Rome and in the 1964 Summer Olympics in Tokyo in which he won a silver medal. He died on 22 January 2019 and was made an honorary citizen of Pernik.

References

1933 births
2019 deaths
Bulgarian male sport wrestlers
Medalists at the 1964 Summer Olympics
Olympic silver medalists for Bulgaria
Olympic medalists in wrestling
Olympic wrestlers of Bulgaria
People from Harmanli
Sportspeople from Haskovo Province
Wrestlers at the 1960 Summer Olympics
Wrestlers at the 1964 Summer Olympics